Alan Warboys (born 18 April 1949) is an English former professional footballer who played as a striker.

Career

Warboys began his career at Doncaster Rovers, making his debut in April 1967 at the age of 17, before moving to Sheffield Wednesday in 1968. Following Wednesday's relegation in 1970, he joined Cardiff City for a fee of £42,000, as a replacement for John Toshack who had joined Liverpool. On his home debut for the club, Warboys scored twice against the team he had just left, Sheffield Wednesday and went on to finish the season having scored 13 goals in 17 league games, including scoring four times in one match during a 4–0 win over Carlisle United, as the club missed out on promotion by one place. After spending one more year at Cardiff, he returned to Yorkshire to join Sheffield United as part of a swap deal which saw Gil Reece and Dave Powell move the other way to Ninian Park.

After a brief spell with Sheffield United, Warboys joined Bristol Rovers. In his five seasons at the club, he forged a lethal forward pairing with Bruce Bannister which would be much-celebrated, taking Rovers to promotion to the Second Division and earning the duo the nickname Smash and Grab in reference to Warboys' physical playing style and Bannisters ability to grab the resulting chances created by Warboys. He later played for Fulham and Hull City before returning to Doncaster Rovers. In his first season back at the club he was awarded the club's Player of the Year award before later moving into defence. Following an operation to remove a disc from his back, he retired in 1982.

After football

After retiring from football, Warboys settled in Doncaster, working as a lorry driver.
He was also the landlord of the Ring 'o' bells in Swinton, South Yorkshire during the 1990's.

References

External links
 

Living people
1949 births
English footballers
Bristol Rovers F.C. players
Doncaster Rovers F.C. players
Sheffield Wednesday F.C. players
Cardiff City F.C. players
Sheffield United F.C. players
Hull City A.F.C. players
Fulham F.C. players
English Football League players
Association football forwards
People from Goldthorpe